The 1967 Mr. Olympia contest was an IFBB professional bodybuilding competition held in September  1967 at the Brooklyn Academy of Music in Brooklyn, New York.  It was the 3rd Mr. Olympia competition held.

Results

Notable events

 Sergio Oliva wins the title, becoming the second Mr. Olympia

References

External links 
 Mr. Olympia

 1967
1967 in American sports
1967 in bodybuilding